The Cosmina is a left tributary of the river Telega in Romania. It discharges into the Telega in Plopeni. It flows through the villages Cosmina de Sus, Cosmina de Jos, Vâlcănești and Cârjari.

References

Rivers of Romania
Rivers of Prahova County